Myriorama can mean one of several kinds of 19th century entertainment, especially:
A late 19th-century form of the moving panorama
A popular optical toy which involved the rearranging of specially-made picture-cards.